Girdwood Airport  is a state-owned public-use airport located three miles (5 km) northeast of the central business district of Girdwood, in Anchorage Borough, Alaska, United States.

Girdwood Airport also served as the Finish Line for the 12th season of the popular 5-time Emmy winning reality TV show, The Amazing Race.

Facilities and aircraft 
For the 12-month period ending December 31, 2019, the airport had 4,000 aircraft operations, an average of 11 per day: 50% general aviation and 50% air taxi.

References

External links 
 FAA Alaska airport diagram (GIF)
 
 

Airports in Anchorage, Alaska